Stanislava Hrozenská was the defending champion, but decided not to participate that year.

Victoria Azarenka won her first singles title here, beating Viktoriya Kutuzova 6–4, 6–2 in the final.

Seeds

Draw

Finals

Top half

Bottom half

References 

2005 ITF Women's Circuit
2005 in Luxembourgian tennis
ITF Roller Open
Tennis tournaments in Luxembourg